The Tanjung Balau Fishermen Museum is a museum in Tanjung Balau, Kota Tinggi District, Johor, Malaysia about fishermen.

History
The construction of the museum began on 20 August 1990 and completed on 8 July 1992 with a total cost of MYR1.48 million which consisted of one main building. In 1997, a souvenir shop was built to be part of the museum. In 2005, the museum was upgraded to include three new galleries.

Architecture
The museum consists of four galleries, which are geology, sea safety, Desaru shipwreck and special exhibition.

Exhibitions
The museum exhibits around 250 artifacts of fishermen equipment. It also displays more than 50 fishermen ships.

See also
 List of museums in Malaysia

References

External links
  

1992 establishments in Malaysia
Kota Tinggi District
Museums established in 1992
Museums in Johor